The 2014 Pan American Men's Handball Championship, was the 16th official competition for senior men's national handball teams of North, Center, Caribbean and South America. It was held from 23 to 29 June 2014 in Uruguay. It also acted as the qualifying competition for the 2015 World Men's Handball Championship, securing three vacancies for the World Championship.

Argentina won the tournament for the third consecutive and sixth time total after defeating Brazil 30–19 in the final.

Participating teams

Venezuela was originally qualified but withdrew one day prior to the tournament.
Cuba was originally qualified but withdrew. The organizing committee tried to find a replacement but Paraguay rejected this offer.

Referees
Six referee pairs were selected.

Preliminary round
The draw was held on 24 May 2014.

All times are local (UTC−3).

Group A

Group B

Knockout stage
All times are local (UTC−3).

Championship bracket

5–8th-place bracket

5–8th-place semifinals

Semifinals

Seventh-place game

Fifth-place game

Third-place game

Final

Ranking and awards

Final ranking

All-Star Team
Goalkeeper:  Maik Santos
Right wing:  Federico Pizarro
Right back:  Rodrigo Salinas
Central back:  Diego Simonet
Left back:  Akutaaneq Kreutzmann
Left wing:  Alejandro Velazco
Pivot:  Marco Oneto

References

External links
Official website
Results on todor66.com

2014 Men
Pan American Men's Handball Championship
Pan American Men's Handball Championship
2014 Pan American Men's Handball Championship
2014 Pan American Men's Handball Championship
June 2014 sports events in South America